These tables are historical listings of state senators who served in the South Dakota Senate from statehood in 1889 until the present.

Members of the South Dakota State Senate (1889–1939)
45 senators elected from 41 districts. Senators were elected from single-member districts, with five counties each electing two at-large senators. The number of senators was reduced to 43 senators from 1893 to 1899. A 42nd District was added in 1909.

Members of the South Dakota State Senate (1939–1967)
35 senators elected from 33 districts. Three counties each elected two at-large senators.

Members of the South Dakota State Senate (1967-Present)
35 senators elected from 35 single-member districts. From 1967 to 1973, there were only 29 districts, with three counties each electing more than one at-large member. District 29 was eliminated from 1973 to 1985, when it became District 11's fifth at-large seat. In 1985, all remaining multi-member districts were eliminated, establishing the current 35 single-member districts.

References

Sources
 South Dakota Secretary of State – 2005 South Dakota Legislative Manual
 South Dakota Secretary of State – Past Elections
 South Dakota Legislature – Legislator Historical Listing

State Senate
State Senate
South Dakota